Christian Academy of Indiana is a private Pre-K through high school Christian school located in New Albany, Indiana.

See also
 List of high schools in Indiana

Notable alumni
Alli Linnehan, volleyball player.

References

External links
 Official website
 Information for 2020-2021 school year

Buildings and structures in New Albany, Indiana
Christian schools in Indiana
Schools in Floyd County, Indiana
Private elementary schools in Indiana
Private middle schools in Indiana
Private high schools in Indiana